"A Little Soul" is a song by British alternative rock band Pulp, from their 1998 album, This Is Hardcore. It was released on 8 June 1998 as the third single from the album, charting at number 22 on the UK Singles Chart.

B-side "Like a Friend" was featured in the 1998 film Great Expectations, and a music video for the song was produced for US music television networks featuring footage from the film. Two versions of the song exist: the "film version" (as featured on the CD1 single at 4:33 in length) and an edited version (at 3:58 in length). The song was also used in the season 4 finale of The Venture Bros. and the Daria episode "Depth Takes a Holiday".

B-side "Cocaine Socialism" surfaced as a "proper recorded version" on the 2006 deluxe edition reissue of the This Is Hardcore album. The song features very similar music but almost entirely different lyrics to the song "Glory Days" which features on the album.

CD two B-side "That Boy's Evil" features no vocals from Jarvis Cocker and was originally released as a white label vinyl by Cocker and Mackey's side project The Chocolate Layers and features spoken word samples from other media in a similar style to Black Box Recorders' "The Facts of Life (Chocolate Layers Remix)"

Track listings

Personnel
 Jarvis Cocker: Vocals
 Mark Webber: Guitars
 Candida Doyle: Piano
 Anne Dudley: Strings
 Steve Mackey: Bass Guitar
 Nick Banks: Drums

Charts

References

External links
 A Little Soul on PulpWiki

Pulp (band) songs
1998 singles
Song recordings produced by Chris Thomas (record producer)
Songs written by Jarvis Cocker
Songs written by Candida Doyle
Songs written by Nick Banks
Songs written by Steve Mackey
Songs written by Mark Webber (guitarist)
1998 songs
Island Records singles